John Stiegelmeier (born February 7, 1957) is a former American football coach. He served as the head football coach at South Dakota State University form 1997 to 2022, compiling a record of 199–112. In his final season, he led the 2022 South Dakota State Jackrabbits football team to the NCAA Division I Football Championship title, the first national title in South Dakota State Jackrabbits football program history.

Stiegelmeier was hired as the 20th head coach of the South Dakota State Jackrabbits football program in 1997. In 1999, Stiegelmeier was named the North Central Conference Coach of the Year after finishing the season with an 8–3 overall record. Stiegelmeier was also honored as the Great West Football Conference Coach of the Year in 2007 after compiling a 7–4 overall record and winning the GWFC title.  He was also named by the American Football Coaches Association as the 2007 NCAA Division I Football Championship Subdivision Region 5 Coach of the Year along with being named one of the five finalists for the 2007 Liberty Mutual Coach of the Year Award. Stiegelmeier was also a finalist in 2009. Stiegelmier is the recipient of the 2022 Eddie Robinson Award.

Head coaching record

College

References

External links
 South Dakota State profile

1957 births
Living people
Northern Iowa Panthers football coaches
Northern State Wolves football coaches
South Dakota State Jackrabbits football coaches
High school football coaches in Wisconsin
South Dakota State University alumni
People from Walworth County, South Dakota
Coaches of American football from South Dakota